The Feather Canyon (or Feather River Canyon) is a  valley in the Feather Headwaters between Pulga, California (west) and Keddie, California (east) along portions of the North Fork Feather River (west & downstream) and the East Branch North Fork Feather River (east & upstream). The canyon is the location of portions of California State Route 70 and the Feather River Route, including the Tobin Bridges.

The Feather River Canyon is well known for high winds. The "Jarbo Winds", named for nearby Jarbo Gap, often blow down the canyon from the northeast. These katabatic winds are caused by high-pressure air over the Great Basin seeking a path through the Sierra Nevada to the low-pressure voids on the California coast. The 2018 Camp Fire, the deadliest wildfire in California's history, was driven into Paradise by these winds. Meteorological records show 36 days since 2003 with gusts of 100 mph or more, up to 200 mph.

References

Feather Headwaters
Canyons and gorges of California
Landforms of Butte County, California
Landforms of Plumas County, California